John List may refer to:

 John A. List (born 1968), American economist
 John List (murderer) (1925–2008), American mass murderer